Mustapha Papa Diop (born 1 May 1987) is a former Senegalese football player.

External links
 OB profile

1987 births
Living people
Senegalese footballers
Odense Boldklub players
Olympique de Marseille players
Association football midfielders